Trstenik is a village in the hills north of Kranj in the Upper Carniola region of Slovenia.

The parish church in the settlement is dedicated to Saint Martin.

References

External links

Trstenik on Geopedia

Populated places in the City Municipality of Kranj